The Columbia and Western Railway (C&W) was a historic, and initially narrow gauge, railway in southern British Columbia.

Heinze ownership

Proposal & planning
Fritz Augustus Heinze, who opened a smelter at Butte, Montana in 1893, was seeking investment opportunities. Attracted by the emerging mining boom on Red Mountain, Rossland, Heinze incorporated the British Columbia Smelting and Refining Company with a commitment to lay trackage between the mines and the Trail smelter. From the smelter, which opened in February 1896, boats could carry the metal concentrate to complete the purification at a refinery. However, his then competitor denied him access to rail transport downriver.

Fearful that further railway competition would capture the ore supply for the smelter, Heinze sought to enlarge the catchment area. He obtained a provincial charter for C&W in April 1896, which authorized a line from the Columbia River west through the metal-rich Boundary District to Penticton on Lake Okanagan. Both ends had river boat services that connected with Canadian Pacific Railway (CP) lines.

Construction & operation
In November 1895, crews began grading a 13-foot wide railbed from Trail along Trail Creek, and up Red Mountain, the final section having switchbacks. The C&W acquired five locomotives, and purchased used rails for laying the  narrow gauge line. The first loaded ore train ran in June 1896. In December that year, the three times daily Rossland–Trail passenger service commenced.

In September 1897, C&W opened a Trail–West Robson line, terminating on the opposite shore to the CP Robson docks. Mixed trains soon ran on the route. From here, steamboat and rail could take concentrate from the Trail smelter to Butte for refining. However, the immediate value of his land grants were small, and Heinze lacked the necessary resources to extend the line westward.

C&W Expanded under CP
In March 1898, CP bought C&W for $600,000. That June, C&W was incorporated federally. At Rossland, a new station, freight shed, two-stall engine house, and coaling dock were erected. Consequently, CP ordered three Shays, which were delivered between May 1900 and December 1903. In 1910, Baldwin 2-8-0 Consolidations replaced the Shays.

With a provincial government subsidy of $4,000 per mile, the line was extended westward from West Robson via Grand Forks, reaching Midway by the end of 1899. A ferry provided the link across the Columbia until the rail bridge at Sproat's Landing opened in March 1902.

Connecting CP lines

Eastward
In May 1891, the Robson–Nelson rail link of the Columbia and Kootenay Railway (C&K) was completed. Between July 1897 and October 1898, CP built westward from Lethbridge via the Crowsnest Pass to the Kootenay Landing terminal. Although the charter specified Nelson, lake boats completed this link until an all-rail route was opened in January 1931. This section accessed the Crowsnest coal deposits.

Westward
Advancing westward from Midway, the Kettle Valley Railway (KVR) connected to Penticton in October 1914, and Merritt in fall 1915, providing a link to Vancouver, with the more direct route via the Coquihalla Pass opening in July 1916. Although technically, west of Midway is KVR, and east is C&W, the Kettle Valley designation was later ascribed to the whole route.

Lines Contracted
When Le Roi mine closed in 1929, big ore trains ceased on the Rossland–Trail section. Highway improvements ended passenger service on this route in 1936. However, the three times a week freight train continued. Frequency progressively reduced until the line was lifted in 1966 west of  Warfield. 

Passenger service on the KVR ended in 1964. The Penticton–Beaverdell track was abandoned in 1973, and Beaverdell–Midway in 1979. The CP eastward almost to Castlegar was abandoned in 1991. The section from Castlegar to Grand Forks is now a cycling trail. The former grade is now biking and skiing trails. 

Only Warfield–Trail–Hugh Keenleyside Dam remain as live lines.

Notable isolated points
Although a crime was suspected, no charges eventuated.

See also

 List of defunct Canadian railways

References 

West Kootenay
Defunct British Columbia railways
Narrow gauge railways in British Columbia